Professor Radcliffe Archibald Emerson (c. 1855-?), M.A. Ox., D.C.L. (Ox.), L.L.D. (Edinburgh), F.B.A., FRS, FRGS, MAPS, Fellow of the Royal Society, Fellow of the Royal Geographical Society, Member of the American Philosophical Society, is one of the main characters in the Amelia Peabody  historical mystery series by author Elizabeth Peters. He is an Egyptologist who is typically addressed as Professor, although he hates his first name and prefers to be called "Emerson." For his explosive temper and dynamic use of language, his Egyptian friends and employees have nicknamed him Abu Shitaim, "Father of Curses".

Emerson is the husband of Amelia Peabody, Egyptologist and self-proclaimed detective, and they are the parents of Walter ("Ramses") Emerson.

Personal history
Very little of Emerson's life story is revealed until He Shall Thunder in the Sky.

His mother was Lady Isabel Courtenay, daughter of the Earl of Radcliffe (one possible reason he hates his first name). His father, Thomas Emerson, was a good-hearted but easygoing man who failed to satisfy his cold-hearted, ambitious wife. Their marriage had become loveless by the time Radcliffe was born, and after his father died, his mother did her best to "shape" Radcliffe into her ideal of a man, which he vehemently resisted. A small inheritance from a distant relative enabled him to escape his mother's control, and the aristocratic marriage she had arranged for him, and pursue his studies as an Egyptologist. His mother disowned him.

Radcliffe became an Egyptologist, while his younger brother Walter became a philologist. The two frequently led archaeological expeditions to Egypt, where Radcliffe was one of the first (and for a while, few) advocates of a methodological approach to archaeology.

In Crocodile on the Sandbank, during a visit to the Cairo museum, the Emersons encountered Amelia Peabody and her friend, Evelyn Forbes. Radcliffe and Amelia instantly butted heads in an argument, and she considered him a rude and patronizing boor. When Amelia visited the Emersons' dig in Amarna, however, Amelia found Radcliffe Emerson ill, and not only nursed him back to health, but also took over part of his duties. Grudgingly, he came to respect her abilities, and at the end, realized he was in love with her.

In the later books Amelia refers to Emerson as "the greatest Egyptologist of this or any other age."

A few years after his marriage and Ramses's birth, Emerson tried to make peace with his mother. She refused his attention, but was unable to prevent him from inheriting his grandfather's estate when she died.

Appearance
When he first appears in Crocodile on the Sandbank, Emerson is described (by Amelia, thus romantically) as tall, well-muscled, with "sapphirine" eyes and dark, wavy black hair. In The Mummy Case, he is described as having Titian highlights in his hair. He prefers to wear a beard, as he is self-conscious about the dimple in his chin (which he calls a cleft), but Amelia, who hates the beard and adores the dimple, makes him shave it at the earliest possible opportunity. In Crocodile, Amelia also describes him as having a "very hairy" chest and body, but this reference is never made again.

Character
Emerson is presented as a dynamic man of action, but one with great tenderness toward his family and friends. He is known to be short-tempered and irascible, but his family and friends hardly ever take notice, knowing he means no harm. However, he has shown genuine anger and a willingness to use violence often enough to make him feared by all the petty criminals and crooked antiques dealers in Egypt.

Emerson remains charmingly oblivious to his few character flaws. He sees himself as the only rational, even-tempered person in the family; he has a boyish enthusiasm for automobiles and motorcycles, though he is mechanically inept and the recklessness of his driving terrifies his family; and he always seizes any opportunity to go about in disguise, especially with a false beard, though it is impossible for anyone to be fooled by them.

He is intolerant of bureaucracy and an advocate of careful methods of excavation and research.  His methods are presented as a great contrast to those of well-known non-fictional archaeological adventurers, who can sometimes be found as minor characters in the books.  More established and careful archaeologists, including William Flinders Petrie and Howard Carter, the discoverer and primary excavator of the tomb of Tutankhamun, are presented more positively.

The Emerson family adventures, to date, are set in both Great Britain and Egypt during the British Imperial period, beginning in approximately 1890 and extending through the 1920s.

References

Fictional archaeologists
Characters in the Amelia Peabody novel series
Literary characters introduced in 1975
Characters in American novels of the 20th century
Fellows of the Royal Geographical Society